M.A.S.K. is a 1985 French/American animated television series produced by DIC and ICC TV Productions, Ltd. The series was based on the M.A.S.K. action figures produced by Kenner Products. It was animated in Japan by Ashi Productions, Studio World and K.K. DiC Asia (later known as K.K. C&D Asia).

Overview
M.A.S.K. (an acronym for "Mobile Armored Strike Kommand") is a special task force led by Matt Trakker, who operate transforming armored vehicles in their ongoing battle against the criminal organization V.E.N.O.M. (an acronym for Vicious Evil Network of Mayhem) with an emphasis on superpowered helmets (called "masks") worn by the characters of both factions.

V.E.N.O.M.'s primary goal was obtaining money through either robbery, extortion, counterfeiting, kidnapping, or attempting to steal historical artifacts, but M.A.S.K. always found a way to foil their plans.

Cast

 Doug Stone – Matt Trakker, Hondo MacLean, Dusty Hayes, Bruce Sato, Nash Gorey, Bruno Sheppard, Boris Bushkin, Maximus Mayhem
 Brendan McKane – Miles Mayhem, Alex Sector, Floyd Malloy, Jacques LaFleur, Nevada Rushmore
 Graeme McKenna – T-Bob, Brad Turner, Julio Lopez, Calhoun Burns
 Mark Halloran – Sly Rax, Buddy Hawks, Cliff Dagger, Ace Riker, Duane Kennedy
 Sharon Noble – M.A.S.K. Computer, Gloria Baker, Vanessa Warfield
 Brian George – Lester Sludge, Ali Bombay
 Brennan Thicke – Scott Trakker

Crew

Season 1 (1985)
 Story editors: Terrence McDonnell and Gary Warne
 Writers: Jina Bacarr, Rod Baker, Creighton Barnes, Patrick Barry, Jack Bornoff, Del Bruckman, Barbara Chain, Kerry Ehrin, Herb Engelhardt, Mel Gilden, Ralph Goodman, David Gottlieb, Barbara Hambly, Trevor Meldal-Johnson, Fred Ladd, Chuck Lorre, Ali Matheson, R. Patrick Neary, Dianne Nezgoda, Jack Olesker, Glen Olson, Alfred A. Pegal, Jessica Radcliff, Ginger Roth, Jeffrey Scott, Chris Weber & Karen Willson, S. S. Wilson, Erica Byrne
 Directors: Bruno Bianchi and Bernard Deyries

Season 2 (1986)
 Story editor: Jack Olesker
 Writers: Ray Dryden, Jack Olesker
 Director: Michael Maliani
 Animation Production: Ashi Production (credited as Ashi Pro.), Studio World (Only the season two end credits gave credit to these studios on screen)

Episodes

A total of 75 syndicated episodes over two seasons were broadcast from September 1985 to November 1986. The first season consisted of 65 episodes. The second season, whose theme centered around auto racing instead of crimefighting, lasted only ten episodes.

Production
One of many cartoons produced during the 1980s as a vehicle for toy merchandising, M.A.S.K. was a hybrid of popular era cartoons G.I. Joe: A Real American Hero and The Transformers. When originally broadcast, M.A.S.K. was the first closed-captioned series to air in first-run syndication.

Home video
Several episodes of the series were released under Karl-Lorimar's "Kideo Video" branding on VHS in the 1980s, with two episodes per tape. The "racing" second season was distributed by Tempest Video.

In the United Kingdom, two releases titled M.A.S.K The Movie, and M.A.S.K The Movie II were released by Tempo Video, featuring episodes edited into a feature-length format.

M.A.S.K. episodes have been released on DVD in three different regions:
 USA: Shout! Factory acquired the Region 1 DVD rights and released a "Complete Series" set on 9 August 2011 containing only the episodes from the first season of the original series (65 episodes), as well as a separate 2-disc collection of the first 11 episodes, called "Volume 1" and released the same day. The second season, which consists of 10 episodes, are owned by WildBrain and are not part of the acquisition.
 UK: A single DVD set containing the first 5 episodes was released by Maximum Entertainment (under license from Jetix Europe) in August 2004. In November 2007, Maximum released Collection 1, containing the same number of episodes as the Australian set. Collection 1 was re-released on 31 August 2009, and Collection 2 was finally released on 28 September the same year. Both sets (the re-issue Collection 1 and Collection 2) are distributed through Lace DVD, replacing Maximum Entertainment, and both sets are in Region 2 PAL format. All 75 episodes were released across both sets.
 Australia and New Zealand: Madman Entertainment released the complete series over two DVD collections for the first time in Australia and New Zealand. Collection 1 was released in November 2006 and contains episodes 1–38, while Collection 2 was released in March 2007 and contains episodes 39–75 which includes the season 2 episodes.

Reception
While certain critics criticized the show for showing the weaponry and vehicles "at the expense of anything deeper in terms of plotting and characterization", the show was quite successful. IGN voted M.A.S.K. the 99th-best animated series in 2009, calling it one of the most popular cartoon/toy marketing franchises of the 1980s, stating that it took many of the strengths of G.I. Joe and Transformers while taking few of their flaws.

In other media
In 2015, Hasbro and Paramount were planning a cinematic universe combining Micronauts with G.I. Joe, Visionaries: Knights of the Magical Light, M.A.S.K. and Rom. A group of writers consisting of Michael Chabon, Brian K. Vaughan, Nicole Perlman, Lindsey Beer, Cheo Coker, John Francis Daley, Jonathan Goldstein, Joe Robert Cole, Jeff Pinkner, Nicole Riegel and Geneva Robertson-Dworet was formed in April 2016 to create a writer's room to develop a storylines for the film. F. Gary Gray was attached to direct the live-action adaptation, while the writer Chris Bremner was hired to pen the script.

Notes

References

External links
 
 Albert Penello's MASK Page – M.A.S.K. toy information and database
 Matt-Trakker.com – M.A.S.K. information
 Boulder-Hill.net – M.A.S.K. toy and merchandise information

French children's animated action television series
French children's animated adventure television series
French children's animated science fiction television series
Television series by DIC Entertainment
Animated television series about robots
Fictional military organizations
Flying cars in fiction
Action figures
Television shows adapted into comics
Comics based on toys
First-run syndicated television programs in the United States
English-language television shows